Margara (also Romanized as Markara; formerly Margara-Gök) is a town in the Armavir Province of Armenia.  Margara is the closest border crossing to Turkey from Yerevan, though at present the border is closed. The town is located on the other side of Alican. Margara has a road bridge across the Arax River to Turkey.  The Border Guard Service of Russia patrols the closed border between Armenia and Turkey.

History
In 2023, the border crossing briefly reopened to allow the passage of humanitarian aid following the Turkey–Syria earthquake for the first time since 1988.

See also 
Armavir Province

References 

World Gazeteer: Armenia – World-Gazetteer.com

External links 
 Video about the Armenia-Turkey border at Margara by ArmeniaLiberty (RFE/RL)

Populated places in Armavir Province
Yazidi populated places in Armenia
Armenia–Turkey border crossings